Astronidium is a genus of plants in family Melastomataceae. It contains the following species (but this list may be incomplete):
 Astronidium degeneri, A.C. Smith
 Astronidium floribundum, (Gillespie) A.C. Smith
 Astronidium fraternum, (A.Gray) J.Maxwell
 Astronidium glabrum, (J.G.Forster) Markgraf
 Astronidium inflatum, (A.C.Sm.) A.C. Smith
 Astronidium kasiense, A.C. Smith
 Astronidium lepidotum, A.C. Smith
 Astronidium ligulatum, (J.Moore) J.Maxwell
 Astronidium macranthum, (A.C. Sm.) A.C. Smith
 Astronidium ovalifolium, (Decne. ex Triana) J.Maxwell
 Astronidium pallidiflorum, A.C. Smith
 Astronidium robustum, (Seem.) A.C. Smith
 Astronidium saccatum, (J.Moore) J.Maxwell
 Astronidium saulae, A.C. Smith
 Astronidium storckii, Seem.
 Astronidium tomentosum, (Seem.) A.C. Smith
 Astronidium victoriae, (Gillespie) A.C. Smith

References

 
Melastomataceae genera
Taxonomy articles created by Polbot